Manukau City was a territorial authority district in Auckland, New Zealand, that was governed by the Manukau City Council. The area is sometimes referred to as "South Auckland", although this term never possessed official recognition and does not encompass areas such as East Auckland, which was within the city boundary. It was a relatively young city, both in terms of legal status and large-scale settlement – though in June 2010, it was the third largest in New Zealand, and the fastest growing. In the same year, the entire Auckland Region was amalgamated under a single city authority, Auckland Council.

The name Manukau, originating from the Manukau Harbour west of the city, is of Māori origin, and means "wading birds", although it has been suggested that the original name of the harbour was Mānuka, meaning a marker post with which an early chief is said to have claimed the area.

History
Manukau City was formed by the amalgamation of Manukau County and Manurewa Borough in 1965. The city expanded in a 1989 New Zealand-wide re-organisation of local government, absorbing Papatoetoe City and Howick Borough, but losing some land to the newly formed Papakura District. On 1 November 2010, Manukau City Council was abolished, and the governed area was amalgamated into the Manukau, Howick, Manurewa-Papakura, and Franklin wards of the new Auckland "super city".

The district was named in 1965 by a poll of residents, ahead of other suggestions that included Churchill (after Sir Winston Churchill); Hobson and Fergusson (after governors general); Massey and Savage (after prime ministers); Kennedy, Rutherford, Ngarimu, Herewini, Snell, Mananui and Manukaurewa.

Manukau County 

Geography
The Manukau City area is concentrated immediately to the south of the Otahuhu isthmus, the narrowest connection between Auckland City and the Northland region and the rest of the North Island. At its narrowest, between the Otahuhu Creek arm of the Tamaki River (itself an estuarial arm of the Hauraki Gulf) in the east and the Mangere Inlet (an arm of the Manukau Harbour) to the west, the isthmus is only some 1500 metres across.

The area to the south of the isthmus contains the heart of Manukau, sprawled on either side of state highways 1 and 20, the latter of which approaches from the west after crossing Māngere Bridge. The area known as Manukau Central is located close to the junction of these two highways, some 20 kilometres southeast of the centre of Auckland city.

Considerable rural and semi-rural land to the east of Manukau Central was within the city council district. This extended towards the Hunua Ranges close to the Firth of Thames, and took in such communities as Clevedon and Maraetai.

Beyond Manukau City to the south is Papakura and the Franklin District, which are less urban, but still part of the Auckland Region, and to some extent regarded as an integral part of Auckland's urban area.

Auckland Airport is located in Mangere, in the west of Manukau, close to the waters of the Manukau Harbour. Manukau City includes the theme park Rainbow's End, and one of the oldest shopping malls in the country, now called Westfield Manukau City.

Transport
In 2009, work started on the Manukau Branch passenger railway line from the North Island Main Trunk at Puhinui. The branch line opened on 15 April 2012 with Manukau railway station as the terminus for Eastern Line services. The Manukau Institute of Technology university campus building is built over the top of the station, which serves the Manukau city centre. On 7 April 2018, a 23-bay bus station (Manukau bus station) was opened on a lot adjacent to the train station to create a transport hub serving most of the southern Auckland Region.

Population
For some years before the 1989 re-organisation of local government, Manukau City had the highest population of any city or district in the country.

Like most of the rest of the region, Manukau is ethnically diverse, and is home to many peoples, especially Māori and members of Polynesian ethnicities, with a recent concentration of Asians in and near Howick. It is densely populated by New Zealand standards, despite having very few apartments or other forms of attached housing.

As of the late 2000s, slightly less than 50% of the city's population identified as European, with 17% as Māori, 27% as Pacific, and 15% as Asian, with the balance made up of other groups.

Schools

Wards and populated places
Manukau City was divided into seven wards; each of them consisting of the following suburbs, towns, localities, settlements and communities:

Botany-Clevedon Ward
 Ardmore
 Whitford
 Alfriston
 Tuscany Estates
 Brookby
 Orere Point
 Chapel Downs
 Clevedon
 Beachlands
 Dannemora
 Maraetai
 Botany Downs
 Kawakawa Bay
 North Park
 Somerville
 Greenmeadows

Howick Ward
 Howick
 Eastern Beach
 Highland Park
 Meadowlands
 Mellons Bay
 Cockle Bay
 Shelly Park
Mangere Ward
 Airport Oaks
 Māngere Bridge
 Māngere East
 Māngere
 Middlemore
 Favona

Manurewa Ward
 Manurewa
 Manurewa East
 Clendon
 Wiri
 Manukau*
 Manukau Heights
 Weymouth
 Waimahia Landing
 Wattle Cove
 Wattle Downs
 Silkwood Heights
 The Gardens
 Totara Heights
 Randwick Park
 Redoubt Park
 Heron Point
 Murphy's Heights
 Mahia Park
 Hill Park
 Goodwood Heights
 Porchester Park
 Settlers Cove

Otara Ward
 Ōtara
 East Tāmaki
 Clover Park
 Flat Bush
Pakuranga Ward
 Pakuranga
 Pakuranga Heights
 Half Moon Bay
 Bucklands Beach
Papatoetoe Ward
 Papatoetoe
 Puhinui

* - otherwise known as Manukau Central or Manukau CBD

Prominent people
Len Brown, former Mayor, and former Mayor of Auckland
Jim Anderton, former city councillor, who rose to be the country's Deputy Prime Minister
Sir Barry Curtis, former long-serving Mayor, from 1983 to 2007
David Lange, former Prime Minister of New Zealand and Member of Parliament for Mangere
Award-winning rapper and former member of The Deceptikonz, Savage

Local government
The Manukau City Council was the elected local authority of the city from 1965 until November 2010 when the Auckland Council was created.

Manukau City had an elected Youth Council which primarily acted as an advisory committee and advocate for youth in the city.

Coat of arms

Sister cities
  Utsunomiya, Tochigi, Japan

References

External links

 Official website until 1 November 2010
 Manukau Directory and Info
 Manukau Street Map
 Manukau City Youth Council

Auckland Region
Territorial authorities of New Zealand
Populated places established in 1989
Populated places disestablished in 2010
Geography of Auckland
History of Auckland
Former subdivisions of the Auckland Region